Daniel George Currie (June 27, 1935 – September 11, 2017) was an American football player in the National Football League (NFL). He played linebacker for nine seasons with the Green Bay Packers and Los Angeles Rams.

Early years
Born and raised in Detroit, Michigan, Currie played college football at Michigan State in East Lansing and was an All-American linebacker and center for the Spartans as a senior

Playing career
Currie was the third overall selection of the 1958 NFL draft, the first pick of the Packers. In that draft, the Packers also selected Jim Taylor of LSU (2nd round, 15th overall), Ray Nitschke of Illinois (3rd round, 36th), and Jerry Kramer of Idaho (4th round, 39th). all future members of the Pro Football Hall of Fame.

In his rookie season in 1958 under first-year head coach Ray "Scooter" McLean, the Packers were a league worst  McLean was fired in December and Vince Lombardi was hired as head coach in January 1959. After reviewing film of the Packers' previous season, Lombardi stated that Currie was the only player on the team that he would not trade or release. Green Bay went  that season and then were in three consecutive NFL title games; they lost to Philadelphia in 1960 and won in 1961 and 1962, both over the New York Giants.

After seven seasons in Green Bay, Currie was traded to the Rams in April 1965 for receiver   two years for Los Angeles, then missed the final cut in September 1967 season at

After football
Currie was later a defensive coach at Milton College in Wisconsin, which closed in 1982. He moved to Las Vegas in the early 1980s and worked in casino security; he died at age 82 at Mountain View Hospital

References

External links
 

1935 births
2017 deaths
Players of American football from Detroit
American football linebackers
Michigan State Spartans football players
All-American college football players
Green Bay Packers players
Los Angeles Rams players
Western Conference Pro Bowl players
Coaches of American football from Michigan
Milton Wildcats football coaches